is a Japanese athlete specialising in the 110 metres hurdles. He twice competed at World Championships, reaching the semifinals in 2007.

His personal best in the event is 13.55 from 2006.

Competition record

National titles
Japanese Championships
110 m hurdles: 2004, 2009, 2010

References

External links

Tasuku Tanonaka at JAAF 
Tasuku Tanonaka at Fujitsu Track & Field Team  (archived)
Tasuku Tanonaka at TBS  (archived)

1978 births
Living people
Sportspeople from Chiba Prefecture
Japanese male hurdlers
Asian Games competitors for Japan
Athletes (track and field) at the 2006 Asian Games
Athletes (track and field) at the 2010 Asian Games
World Athletics Championships athletes for Japan
Japan Championships in Athletics winners